Václav Bucháček was a Czech swimmer. He competed in the men's 100 metre freestyle event at the 1920 Summer Olympics.

References

External links
 

Year of birth missing
Year of death missing
Czech male freestyle swimmers
Olympic swimmers of Czechoslovakia
Swimmers at the 1920 Summer Olympics
Place of birth missing